Robert Hildyard may refer to:

Sir Robert Hildyard, 1st Baronet (1612–1685), of the Hildyard baronets
Sir Robert Hildyard, 2nd Baronet (1671–1729), English landowner and Member of Parliament
Sir Robert Hildyard, 3rd Baronet (1716–1781), MP for Great Bedwyn
Sir Robert Hildyard, 4th Baronet (1743–1814), of the Hildyard baronets
Robert Hildyard (MP) (1800–1857), British Conservative politician
Robert Hildyard (judge) (born 1952), judge of the High Court of England and Wales

See also
Hildyard, surname